Podocarpus coriaceus, commonly known as the yucca plum pine, is a species of conifer, an evergreen tree in the family Podocarpaceae. It is found in the Dominican Republic, Guadeloupe, Martinique, Montserrat, Puerto Rico, and Saint Kitts and Nevis.

Description
Podocarpus coriaceus is a small tree rarely exceeding  in height. The bark is thick and smooth when young, growing fissured and flaky with age. The branches are spreading, and often contorted. They have parallel sides and straight margins, the upper surface being dark green and the underside dull green.

Distribution and habitat
This tree is endemic to the West Indies where it has a unique distribution. It is found in the arc of islands from Trinidad to Hispaniola but is completely absent from some islands that would appear to have suitable mountains with ideal growing conditions. It occurs on Trinidad, Tobago, St Lucia, Martinique, Dominica, Guadeloupe, Montserrat, Saint Kitts and Nevis, Hispaniola, and Puerto Rico. It mostly occurs above  but also grows lower than this on Nevis, Trinidad and Tobago. In Puerto Rico, it occurs in the mountains in the west and in the Sierra de Luquillo in the east, but not the main Cordillera Central range in the centre of the island where the highest mountains are. The reasons for this patchy distribution are unclear.

Status
As a common species in the islands on which it grows, facing no particular threats, the conservation status of P. coriaceus is assessed by the International Union for Conservation of Nature as being of "least concern.

References

coriaceus
Trees of the Caribbean
Taxonomy articles created by Polbot